Limnocythere inopinata is a species of crustacean belonging to the family Limnocytheridae.

It has cosmopolitan distribution.

References

Limnocytheridae